Lucy Ives (born 1980) is an American novelist, poet, and critic.

Born in New York City, Ives graduated from Harvard University with a BA and from the Iowa Writers' Workshop with an MFA. Ives earned her PhD in comparative literature from New York University.

Ives's long poem Anamnesis (2009) won the Slope Editions Book Prize. In 2013 Ives published a novella, Nineties, her second novella, The Worldkillers, was published in 2014. Orange Roses, a collection of essays and poetry, was published in 2013. Ives's novel Impossible Views of the World (2017) was chosen as a New York Times Editors' Choice and published by Penguin. Her second novel, Loudermilk: Or, The Real Poet; Or, The Origin of the World, was published by Soft Skull Press in 2019. Her first story-collection, Cosmogony, was published by Soft Skull Press in 2021.

Ives has been the recipient of an Iowa Arts fellowship, a MacCracken fellowship, and a Creative Capital | Andy Warhol Foundation Arts Writers Grant.

Bibliography
Anamnesis (2009)
Nineties (2013)
Orange Roses (2013)
The Worldkillers (2014)
The Hermit (2016) 
Impossible Views of the World (2017)
Loudermilk: Or, The Real Poet; Or, The Origin of the World (2019)
Cosmogony (2021)
Life Is Everywhere (2022)

References

External links

Ives at The Poetry Foundation

1980 births
Date of birth unknown
21st-century American poets
Poets from New York (state)
21st-century American essayists
American women novelists
21st-century American novelists
21st-century American non-fiction writers
American women essayists
American women poets
Harvard University alumni
Iowa Writers' Workshop alumni
New York University alumni
Writers from New York City
Living people
21st-century American women writers